Marriage of the Virgin is an oil on canvas painting by Luca Giordano, executed c. 1688, probably from a series of scenes from the Life of the Virgin for the Palacio Real by the artist, a series which also included Adoration of the Shepherds. Both this work and Adoration are now in the Louvre in Paris.

References

 Luca Giordano, 1634-1705, Editrice Electa (2001) 

1688 paintings
Paintings by Luca Giordano
Paintings in the Louvre by Italian artists
Giordano